The Central Bank of Bosnia and Herzegovina (Bosnian, Croatian and Serbian: Centralna banka Bosne i Hercegovine / Централна банка Босне и Херцеговине) is the central bank of Bosnia and Herzegovina, located in the capital city, Sarajevo.

The Central Bank of Bosnia and Herzegovina was established in accordance with the Law adopted at the Parliamentary Assembly of Bosnia and Herzegovina on June 20, 1997.  It started its operation on August 11, 1997.

The Central Bank of Bosnia and Herzegovina maintains monetary stability by issuing domestic currency according to the currency board arrangement with full coverage in freely convertible foreign exchange funds under the fixed exchange rate (1 BAM: 0.51129 EUR). The Central Bank of Bosnia and Herzegovina defines and controls the implementation of monetary policy of Bosnia and Herzegovina. The Central Bank of Bosnia and Herzegovina supports and maintains appropriate payment and settlement systems. It also co-ordinates the activities of the BH Entity Banking Agencies, which are in charge of bank licensing and supervision.

The Central Bank of Bosnia and Herzegovina has the head office, three main units and two branches. The head office of the Central Bank of Bosnia and Herzegovina is in Sarajevo. The main units are the Main Unit Sarajevo, the Main Bank of Republika Srpska CBBH Banja Luka and Main Unit Mostar. The branches are: the CBBH Branch in Brčko and the Main Bank of Republika Srpska CBBH Branch in Pale.

The senior body of the Central Bank of Bosnia and Herzegovina is the governing board, which is in charge of establishing and supervision of monetary policy, organization and strategies of the Central Bank, all according to the powers given to the board by the law. According to the law on CBBH, the governing board consists of five persons that are appointed by the BH presidency for a six-year mandate. The governing board appoints one of its members as governor.

The governor of the Central Bank of Bosnia and Herzegovina is Senad Softić.

The management of the Central Bank of Bosnia and Herzegovina consists of a governor and three vice governors, appointed by the governor with the approval of the governing board. The task of the management is the operative management of the Central Bank business. Each vice governor is directly responsible for the operations of one sector of the Central Bank.

Governors
Source:
Peter Nicholl (20 June 1997 – 31 December 2004)
Kemal Kozarić (1 January 2005 – 11 August 2015)
Senad Softić (11 August 2015 – present)

See also

Bosnia and Herzegovina convertible mark
Economy of Bosnia and Herzegovina
Economy of Europe
List of central banks

References

External links

Central Bank of Bosnia and Herzegovina official website - Available in Bosnian, Serbian, Croatian and English
Law on the Central Bank of Bosnia and Herzegovina - ("Official Gazette of Bosnia and Herzegovina", 1/97, 29/02, 8/03, 13/03, 9/05, and 76/06) 

Economy of Bosnia and Herzegovina
Bosnia and Herzegovina
Banks of Bosnia and Herzegovina
1997 establishments in Bosnia and Herzegovina
Banks established in 1997
Banking in Bosnia and Herzegovina